Dwayne Crump is a former professional American football player who played defensive back for four seasons for the St. Louis Cardinals He finished his career playing 2 season with the Montreal Alouettes, winning the Grey Cup in 1977.

References

1950 births
American football cornerbacks
Fresno State Bulldogs football players
St. Louis Cardinals (football) players
Montreal Alouettes players
American players of Canadian football
Living people
People from Madera, California